Johanna ter Steege (born 10 May 1961) is a Dutch actress.

She won the European Film Award for Best Supporting Actress for her movie debut in The Vanishing (1988). Among her other films are Robert Altman's Vincent & Theo (1990), István Szabó's Meeting Venus (1991) and Sweet Emma, Dear Böbe (1992), Bernard Rose's Immortal Beloved (1994), and Bruce Beresford's Paradise Road (1997).

In 1993, she was a member of the jury at the 43rd Berlin International Film Festival and was awarded with the Berlinale Camera.

In 1994,  after Julia Roberts and Uma Thurman declined, Stanley Kubrick cast her for his adaptation of Louis Begley's novel Wartime Lies.  Kubrick abandoned the project after it became clear that Steven Spielberg's Schindler's List would be released first.

Filmography

Television

References

External links

1961 births
European Film Awards winners (people)
Living people
People from Wierden
Dutch film actresses
20th-century Dutch actresses
21st-century Dutch actresses